Lopwell is a site of natural beauty situated at the normal tidal limit of the River Tavy, 3 miles from north Plymouth and 7 miles from Tavistock, Devon, England.

Lopwell Dam is a Local Nature Reserve consisting of several different habitats including saltmarsh, freshwater marsh and ancient semi-natural woodland. Mammals include roe deer, otters and Atlantic grey seals. The area forms part of the Tamar–Tavy Estuary Site of Special Scientific Interest

References

Local Nature Reserves in Devon
Sites of Special Scientific Interest in Devon